The 1947 Campeonato de Selección y Competencia, the top category of Peruvian football at the time, was played by 8 teams. The national champion was Atlético Chalaco.

Results

Standings

References

External links 
 Peru 1947 season at RSSSF
 Peruvian Football League News 

Peru1
Peruvian Primera División seasons
1